Colus pygmaeus, common name the pygmy whelk, is a species of sea snail, a marine gastropod mollusk in the family Colidae, the true whelks and the like.

Description
The length of the shell attains 23.9 mm.

Distribution
This species occurs in the Northeast Atlantic Ocean.

References

 Abbott, R. T. (1974). American seashells. The marine Mollusca of the Atlantic and Pacific coast of North America. ed. 2. Van Nostrand, New York. 663 pp., 24 pls.
 Turgeon, D., Quinn, J. F., Bogan, A. E., Coan, E. V., Hochberg, F. G., Lyons, W. G., Mikkelsen, P. M., Neves, R. J., Roper, C. F. E., Rosenberg, G., Roth, B., Scheltema, A., Thompson, F. G., Vecchione, M., Williams, J. D. (1998). Common and scientific names of aquatic invertebrates from the United States and Canada: mollusks. 2nd ed. American Fisheries Society Special Publication, 26. American Fisheries Society: Bethesda, MD (USA). ISBN 1-888569-01-8. IX, 526 + cd-rom pp.
  Gosner, K. L. (1971). Guide to identification of marine and estuarine invertebrates: Cape Hatteras to the Bay of Fundy. John Wiley & Sons, Inc., London. 693 pp
 Linkletter, L. E. (1977). A checklist of marine fauna and flora of the Bay of Fundy. Huntsman Marine Laboratory, St. Andrews, N.B. 68: p

External links
 Gould, A. A. (1841). Report on the Invertebrata of Massachusetts, Comprising the Mollusca, Crustacea, Annelida, and Radiata. Published Agreeably to an Order of the Legislature, by the Commissioners on the Zoological and Botanical Survey of the State. Folsom, Wells, and Thurston, Cambridge, xiii + 373 pp., 15 pls.
 Linsley, J. H. 1845. Catalogue of the shells of Connecticut. The American Journal of Science and Arts 48: 271-286
 Verrill, A.E. (1882). Catalogue of marine Mollusca added to the fauna of the New England region, during the past ten years. Transactions of the Connecticut Academy of Arts and Sciences. 5(2): 447-587, pls 42-44, 57-58.
 Trott, T. J. (2004). Cobscook Bay inventory: a historical checklist of marine invertebrates spanning 162 years. Northeastern Naturalist. 11, 261-324.

Colidae
Gastropods described in 1841